Tommi Johannes Eronen (born 18 September 1968) is a Finnish actor, best known for starring in the movies Jade Warrior (2006) and Bad Luck Love (2000). His performance in Bad Luck Love garnered him a Jussi Award for Best Supporting Actor.

Personal life
Eronen was born in Kuopio, Finland, and was married to actress Ria Kataja until 2012. Together they have two children.

Selected filmography
Kesäyön unelma (1994)
Rukajärven tie (1999)
Bad Luck Love (2000)
Onnenpeli 2001 (2001)
Emmauksen tiellä (2001)
Producing Adults (2004)
Miehen sydän (2004)
Jade Warrior (2006)
Sauna (2008)
The House of Branching Love (2009)
Vares – Uhkapelimerkki (2012)
Koukussa (2015)

External links

References

Finnish male actors
1968 births
Living people
People from Kuopio